Satte Pe Satta (transl. 'Seven on Seven') is an Indian Hindi-language action-comedy film released in 1982 and directed by Raj N. Sippy, and produced by Romu N. Sippy. The film stars Amitabh Bachchan, Hema Malini, Amjad Khan, Ranjeeta Kaur and Sachin Pilgaonkar in lead roles with Sudhir Luthria, Shakti Kapoor, Kanwarjit Paintal, Kanwaljit Singh and Vikram Sahu in supporting roles.

The story revolves around seven unsophisticated brothers who all are civilized by Indu (Malini), the wife of the eldest brother Ravi Anand (Bachchan). However, things take a turn when Ravi's lookalike Babu is sent to murder Seema Singh (Kaur), a disabled heiress, by her cunning uncle Ranjit Singh (Khan). But Babu falls in love with Seema.

The film was adapted from Seven Brides for Seven Brothers (1954) and was remade in Marathi by Sachin Pilgaonkar as Aamhi Satpute (2008).

Plot 

Satte Pe Satta is the story of seven brothers - Som, Mangal, Budh, Guru, Shukra, Shani and Ravi - living on a farmhouse among animals. All the six younger brothers have grown up under the leadership of the oldest brother Ravi Anand (Amitabh Bachchan). Being orphans and uneducated, all of them are unsophisticated bumpkins who lack social etiquette and hygiene. Ravi always defends his youngest brother Shani Anand (Sachin Pilgaonkar) whenever his other five brothers try to trouble him harmfully. However, they all end up forgiving and uniting with each other. Ravi does not plan to marry until he meets a hospital nurse named Indu (Hema Malini) through a sequence of incidents. He falls in love with her, although she dislikes him due to his undisciplined behaviour and disgusting look. Along with Shani, Ravi tricks Indu into believing that he is his only one younger brother. He even grooms himself as a proper human and appears before her in his new form. Indu eventually reciprocates Ravi's feelings and the two get married. 

After their marriage, Indu is initially happy that only the three of them live in the remote farmhouse, away from loud noise and non-cleanliness,  which leaves Ravi frightened. After entering his house, she is shocked to learn that Ravi has five more brothers, all uncivilized and uncouth, but agrees to stay on their request. Shani and the brothers struggle to adjust with a new girl in their lives and so does Indu, who grooms them all too as proper humans and plans to civilize them. Few days later, the brothers meet six sisters at a beach and respectively fall in love with each one, and the feeling is mutual. The sisters are the caretakers of Seema Singh (Ranjeeta Kaur), a wealthy heiress who is unable to walk due to paraplegia. Her uncle Ranjit Singh (Amjad Khan) has devious plans of murdering her in order to gain the possession of her ancestral property. He gets a prisoner Babu Sharma (also Amitabh Bachchan) released from jail and hires him to kill Seema. 

Meanwhile, Ravi is saddened to see that the brothers are terribly missing their love interests, and are thus unable to concentrate on their work. In order to make them feel better, he unintentionally helps them break into the girls' house and kidnap them all with Seema. Indu is irked with Ravi and the brothers, but agrees to let the girls stay. Soon, Ranjit learns about Seema's visit to the farmhouse and invites Ravi to his house to help him collect some clothes and medicines for Seema. 

During their meeting, he is shocked to see that Ravi is an exact doppelganger of Babu. Taking advantage of this, Ranjit sends Babu to impersonate Ravi with an exchange of one lakh rupees in order to have him murder Seema. Ravi is captured and imprisoned at a remote island by Ranjit's henchmen. Undergoing a complete makeover, Babu transforms himself into Ravi whose car and other belongings are obtained by him as well. Babu then goes to live in Ravi's house where he is shocked to learn that Indu is pregnant with Ravi's child. However, he is quickly accepted by Indu and the brothers as no one suspects a thing. Meanwhile, Ranjit makes Ravi suffer a lot at the island and plans to frame him for Seema's murder. 

At Ravi's house, Babu grabs an opportunity and is about to murder Seema with his dagger but due to the shock, she regains the control of her legs and is able to walk again. On seeing everyone's happiness, Babu is eventually overcome with guilt and falls in love with Seema. During the festival of Karva Chauth, he ends up revealing his true identity and Ranjit's intentions to the family, confessing his crime and subsequent reformation to them. Shanu forgives him as he did not cause any harm to their sister-in-law Indu, who is like a mother to them. Babu then promises Indu that whether he himself lives or not, her husband will surely remain alive. 

The next day, Babu takes the brothers to the island and tries to trick Ranjit into releasing Ravi. Ranjit outsmarts him and captures him with all the brothers, beating up Ravi badly and knocking him out. However, the brothers motivate Ravi by repeating their motto to regain consciousness and fight against Ranjit. Ravi eventually succeeds in defeating Ranjit (presumably to death) and is reunited with his brothers. Babu then decides to leave which causes a heartbroken Seema to lose the control of her legs again as she had fallen in love with him as well. Using his dagger, Babu makes her stand up from her wheelchair and Ravi also reunites with Indu, while the brothers marry their girlfriends. The films ends with all the eight couples happily embracing each other.

Cast 

 Amitabh Bachchan in a dual role as
 Ravi Anand (Indu's husband and Shani's eldest brother) 
 Babu Sharma (Ranjit's employee and Seema's love interest) 
 Hema Malini as Indu R. Anand (Ravi's wife) 
 Amjad Khan as Ranjit Singh (Seema's uncle and Babu's employer) 
 Ranjeeta Kaur as Seema Singh (Ranjit's niece and Babu's love interest)
 Sachin Pilgaonkar as Shani Anand (Ravi's sixth-youngest brother and Indu's brother-in-law)
 Sudhir as Som Anand (Ravi's first-youngest brother) 
 Shakti Kapoor as Mangal Anand (Ravi's second-youngest brother) 
 Kanwarjit Paintal as Budh Anand (Ravi's third-youngest brother) 
 Kanwaljit Singh as Guru Anand (Ravi's fourth-youngest brother) 
 Vikram Sahu as Shukra Anand (Ravi's fifth-youngest brother) 
 Aradhana as Som's girlfriend 
 Prema Narayan as Mangal's girlfriend 
 Madhu Malhotra as Budh's girlfriend 
 Asha Sachdev as Guru's girlfriend 
 Shobhini Singh as Shukra's girlfriend 
 Rajni Sharma as Shani's girlfriend  
 Mac Mohan as Ranjit's henchman 
 Kalpana Iyer as Ranjit's mistress
 Vijayendra Ghatge as Shekhar (Ravi's friend) 
 Sarika Thakur as Sheela (Indu's friend)
 Manmauji as Hospital Watchman
 Kader Khan as Narrator

Soundtrack
The lyrics of all the songs were written by Gulshan Bawra except  'Dilbar Mere', which was written by Anand Bakshi, and music was composed by Rahul Dev Burman.

See also
 Amhi Satpute (2008)
 Peralikarayo Sinhala Movie (1986)

References

External links
 Rediff
 

1980s Hindi-language films
1982 films
Films scored by R. D. Burman
Films about Indian weddings
Indian action comedy films
Indian remakes of American films
Hindi remakes of English films
Hindi films remade in other languages
Films directed by Raj N. Sippy
1980s action comedy films